The 2009 Queensland state election was held on 21 March 2009 to elect all 89 members of the Legislative Assembly, a unicameral parliament.

The election saw the incumbent Labor government led by Premier Anna Bligh defeat the Liberal National Party of Queensland led by Opposition Leader Lawrence Springborg, and gain a fifth consecutive term in office for her party. Bligh thus became the first female Premier of any Australian State elected in her own right.

The 2009 election marked the eighth consecutive victory of Labor in a general election since 1989, although it was out of office between 1996 and 1998 as a direct result of the 1996 Mundingburra by-election.

Key dates

Results 

| colspan=7 |* The two-party preferred summary is an estimate by Antony Green using a methodology by Malcolm Mackerras.
|}

Seats changing hands 

¶ Ronan Lee was elected as a member of the Labor Party in 2006, but he defected to the Greens in 2008.

One of the gains by the Liberal Nationals was the defeat of the Minister for Sustainability, Climate Change and Innovation Andrew McNamara (Hervey Bay).  The Parliamentary Secretary to the Minister for Education, Training and the Arts, Bonny Barry (Aspley), was also defeated.

Date 
The previous state election was held on 9 September 2006 to elect the 89 members of the Legislative Assembly. In Queensland, for the government to serve a full-term, an election will be held approximately three years following the previous election. In Queensland, Section 80 of the Electoral Act 1992 states that an election must be held on a Saturday; and that the election campaign must run for a minimum of 26 or a maximum of 56 days following the issue of the writs. Five to seven days following the issue of the writs, the electoral roll is closed, which gives voters a final opportunity to enrol or to notify the Electoral Commission of Queensland of any changes in their place of residence.

Legislative Assembly 

 The Labor Party, led by Premier Anna Bligh, and the LNP, led by Opposition Leader Lawrence Springborg, were the two main parties in Queensland at the election. It was the first election contested by the LNP following its creation with the merger of the National and Liberal parties. At the previous election, Labor won 59 seats, the Nationals won 17 seats, the Liberals won eight seats, One Nation won one seat, and independents won four seats. Former Labor MP Ronan Lee joined the Greens in 2008, thus becoming their parliamentary leader. Lee lost his seat at the election.

A redistribution saw Labor notionally pick up three seats. Therefore, the LNP notionally needed to pick up 22 seats rather than 20 seats to form a majority government, which equated to an unchanged uniform 8.3 percent two party preferred swing.

Former Premier Peter Beattie resigned in September 2007, which triggered the October 2007 Brisbane Central by-election.

Parties contesting the election 

† Contested 2006 elections as Liberal Party (49 seats) and National Party (40) seats.

Both the Australian Labor Party and the Greens contested all 89 seats. This was the first Queensland state election in which the Greens contested every seat. The LNP contested every seat except Gladstone (held by an Independent), which they avoided for strategic reasons. A total of 397 candidates contested the election—the largest number of candidates to contest a Queensland election since 1998.

Post-election pendulum

Polling 
Newspoll polling was conducted via random telephone number selection in city and country areas. Sampling sizes usually consist of around 1000 electors, with the declared margin of error at around ±3 percent.

See also 
 Candidates of the Queensland state election, 2009
 Members of the Queensland Legislative Assembly, 2006–2009
 Members of the Queensland Legislative Assembly, 2009–2012

References

External links 
 Electoral Commission Queensland
 2009 Queensland election - Antony Green ABC

2009 elections in Australia
Elections in Queensland
2000s in Queensland
March 2009 events in Australia